The second round of CONCACAF matches for 2018 FIFA World Cup qualification was played from 7 to 16 June 2015.

Format
A total of 20 teams (teams ranked 9–21 in the CONCACAF entrant list and seven first round winners) played home-and-away over two legs. The ten winners advanced to the third round.

Seeding
The draw for the second round was held on 15 January 2015, 19:40 EST (UTC−5), at the W Hotel at Miami Beach, Florida, United States.

The seeding was based on the FIFA World Rankings of August 2014 (shown in parentheses). The 20 teams were seeded into four pots:
Pot 3 contained the teams ranked 8–10 (i.e., 16–18 in the CONCACAF entrant list).
Pot 4 contained the teams ranked 11–13 (i.e., 19–21 in the CONCACAF entrant list).
Pot 5 contained the teams ranked 1–7 (i.e., 9–15 in the CONCACAF entrant list).
Pot 6 contained the seven first round winners.

Each tie contained a team from Pot 3 and a team from Pot 4 (first three ties), or a team from Pot 5 and a team from Pot 6 (last seven ties), with the order of legs decided by draw. As the draw was held before the first round was played, the identities of teams in Pot 6 (first round winners) were not known at the time of the draw.

Note: Bolded teams qualified for the third round.

Matches
|}

6–6 on aggregate. Saint Vincent and the Grenadines won on the away goals rule and advanced to the third round.

Antigua and Barbuda won 5–4 on aggregate and advanced to the third round.

Grenada won 2–1 on aggregate and advanced to the third round.

Canada won 6–0 on aggregate and advanced to the third round.

Belize won 5–1 on aggregate and advanced to the third round.

Guatemala won 1–0 on aggregate and advanced to the third round.

Aruba won 3–2 on aggregate and advanced to the third round.

El Salvador won 6–3 on aggregate and advanced to the third round.

1–1 on aggregate. Curaçao won on the away goals rule and advanced to the third round.

Nicaragua won 4–1 on aggregate and advanced to the third round.

Goalscorers

Notes

References

External links

Qualifiers – North, Central America and Caribbean: Round 2, FIFA.com
World Cup Qualifying – Men, CONCACAF.com

2
Qual2